Kres is an unincorporated community in Nevada County, California. It lies at an elevation of 2861 feet (872 m).

References

Unincorporated communities in California
Unincorporated communities in Nevada County, California